Keep Britain Untidy is the first solo album from Tom Hingley, the ex-frontman of The Inspiral Carpets. The album is his first studio album since the split of Inspiral Carpets.

Track listing
"Inside"
"The Silver and The Gold"
"Taste of You"
"Straight Into Your Heart"
"Between Us"
"Whole"
"Port In A Storm"
"You Don't Care About Tomorrow"
"All Night Long"
"Goodbye To The Lord Of My Life"
"What Can I Loose?"

External links
Townsend Records

2000 albums
Tom Hingley albums